Radekhiv Raion was a raion in Lviv Oblast in western Ukraine. Its administrative center was Radekhiv. The raion was abolished on 18 July 2020 as part of the administrative reform of Ukraine, which reduced the number of raions of Lviv Oblast to seven. The area of Radekhiv Raion was merged into Chervonohrad Raion.

It was established in 1965.

At the time of disestablishment, the raion consisted of two hromadas:
 Lopatyn settlement hromada with the administration in the urban-type settlement of Lopatyn;
 Radekhiv urban hromada with the administration in Radekhiv.

See also
 Administrative divisions of Lviv Oblast

References

External links
 Радехів Інформаційно - розважальний сайт
 radekhiv.lviv.ua 

Former raions of Lviv Oblast
1965 establishments in Ukraine
Ukrainian raions abolished during the 2020 administrative reform